The SUV (sport utility vehicle) is a car classification that combines elements of road-going passenger cars with features from off-road vehicles.

SUV may also refer to:
 A small unilamellar liposome/vesicle, a liposome with a single lipid bilayer
 The IATA code for Nausori International Airport, Fiji
 Standardized uptake value, a nuclear medicine term
 Saybolt universal viscosity